Work Co,. Ltd is a high-end Japanese wheel manufacturer for both motorsport and street use. They manufacture the "WORK Equip" and "WORK Meister" range of wheels.

WORK Wheels released their first range of wheels in 1977 under the name "WORK Equip", which continue to be manufactured today under popular demand. Commonly regarded as the leading manufacturer of Single, Two and Three piece forged wheels for automotive use, WORK Wheels adopt a "on demand system" in order to produce products under direct request of their customers and corporate customers. Current major corporate customers include Dunlop Falken Tire, Toyo Tires, Toyota Modellista International Co, FUJI Corporation, Bridgestone and Ralliart.

WORK Wheels is a long-standing member of both the Japan Light-Alloy Wheel Association (JAWA) and Japan External Trade Organization (JETRO).

The company's founder, Takeshi Tanaka, died in 2015.

Current lines 

 Equip
 Emotion
 Meister
 VS
 LS
 Emitz
 Zeast
 Gnosis
 Gnosis FMB
 Gnosis AE
 Gnosis GSR
 Gnosis IS
 Gnosis GR
 Gnosis CV
 Schwert
 Lanvec
 Rizaltado
 MCO
 Gran Seeker
 Seeker
 CRAG
 Lead Sled
 Goocars
 XTRAP
 Zistance
 Back Label

Discontinued lines 

 Arkline
 Astley
 Balmung
 Brombacher
 Durandal
 Euroline
 Nezart
 Pietra
 Promising
 Ryver
 Rezax
 Rusttere
 Script
 Sporbo
 Steez
 Urbanzone
 Varianza
 WIL (Work Import Label)
 XSA

History
WORK Wheels timeline:

Notable products
Euroline
Equip
Rezax
Workemotion
Meister
CR2P
VSXX
VSKF
S13P
S1R
CR Kai
Autostrada Modena

References

External links 
 Work Wheels USA

Wheel manufacturers
Automotive accessories
Automotive motorsports and performance companies
Manufacturing companies based in Osaka
Japanese companies established in 1977
Manufacturing companies established in 1977
Japanese brands